Salix fuscescens is a species of flowering plant in the willow family known by the common name Alaska bog willow. It is native to northern North America, where it occurs throughout much of Alaska and across northern Canada. It is also present in Eurasia.

The species is dioecious, with male and female flowers occurring on separate individuals. The fruit is a two-valved capsule that releases tiny, downy seeds.

This plant grows in spruce-fir ecosystems, such as coniferous bogs. It can be found on tundra, in swamps, and on riverbanks. It often occurs with many other species of willows.

References

External links
The Nature Conservancy

fuscescens